The following lists events that happened during 1970 in Australia.

Incumbents

Monarch – Elizabeth II
Governor-General – Sir Paul Hasluck
Prime Minister –  John Gorton
Deputy Prime Minister – John McEwen
Opposition Leader –  Gough Whitlam
Chief Justice – Sir Garfield Barwick

State and Territory Leaders
Premier of New South Wales – Robert Askin
Opposition Leader – Pat Hills
Premier of Queensland – Joh Bjelke-Petersen
Opposition Leader – Jack Houston
Premier of South Australia – Steele Hall (until 2 June), then Don Dunstan
Opposition Leader – Don Dunstan (until 2 June), then Steele Hall
Premier of Tasmania – Angus Bethune
Opposition Leader – Eric Reece
Premier of Victoria – Sir Henry Bolte
Opposition Leader – Clyde Holding
Premier of Western Australia – Sir David Brand
Opposition Leader – John Tonkin

Governors and Administrators
Governor of New South Wales – Sir Roden Cutler
Governor of Queensland – Sir Alan Mansfield
Governor of South Australia – Major General Sir James William Harrison
Governor of Tasmania – Lieutenant General Sir Edric Bastyan
Governor of Victoria – Major General Sir Rohan Delacombe
Governor of Western Australia – Major General Sir Douglas Kendrew
Administrator of Norfolk Island – Robert Dalkin
Administrator of the Northern Territory – Roger Dean (until 4 March), then Frederick Chaney
Administrator of Papua and New Guinea – David Hay (until July), then Les Johnson

Events
 1 January – Newcastle, New South Wales suffers a fierce hailstorm.
 3 January – Police in Liverpool, Sydney conduct a high speed car chase after Wally Mellish, a central figure in the July 1968 Glenfield siege.
 4 January – The Victorian Government appoints William Kaye, QC to investigate allegations that some senior police officers took bribes from abortion care providers.
1,000 New South Wales state powerhouse operators go on strike.
 5 January – Federal Opposition Leader Gough Whitlam tells a meeting of Wewak Councillors in Port Moresby that the Territory House of Assembly was a "rubber stamp" for policies formulated in Canberra.
 7 January – The U.S. seismic survey vessel Polaris catches fire at Port Adelaide, causing $750,000 worth of damage.
Federal Opposition Leader Gough Whitlam announces in Rabaul, Papua New Guinea that a New Guinean would be appointed as Administrator of the Territory immediately if Labor won the next election.
The Australian Wheatgrowers' Federation recommends a national wheat quota reduction for the 1970–71 season.
 8 January – The Army Minister Andrew Peacock denies the statement made the previous day by senior Labor figure Jim Cairns that Australian officers in Vietnam had suggested to troops that they would be home by June.
Queensland Labor Senator George Georges rejects oil company assurances that drilling in the Great Barrier Reef area could be done in such away that the reef would be preserved in an untouched state.
 12 January – Prime Minister John Gorton announces the number of cannons to be distributed and the locations of these cannons for the Captain Cook celebrations.  New South Wales, Canberra and Queensland will each receive one of the six cannons jettisoned by Captain Cook from the Endeavour on the Great Barrier Reef in 1770.
National Development Minister Reg Swartz announces that an Australian team is in San Francisco drawing up specifications for Australia's first nuclear power station to be stationed at Jervis Bay.
Three-year-old Cheryl Grimmer vanishes from Fairy Meadow Beach near Wollongong.
 13 January – US Vice-President Spiro Agnew arrives in Canberra.  14 are arrested during protests outside Parliament House over Mr. Agnew's visit on 14 January.
 14 January – Prime Minister Gorton announces that Ampol Exploration Ltd. is not proceeding with its intention to drill for oil in the Great Barrier Reef pending a thorough examination of whether there might be damage to the reef.
 15 January – 
Brisbane is hit by a dust storm.
Sydney police receive a $10,000 ransom note for the return of missing three-year-old Cheryl Grimmer.
Canberra police investigate possibly dangerous chemicals thrown into the swimming pool of the Prime Minister's Lodge which appeared to be eating into the tiled walls of the pool in which Prime Minister Gorton swims every morning.
 17 January – Cyclone Ada hits Central Queensland, killing 14.
 19 January – Queensland Premier Joh Bjelke-Petersen agrees to a Commonwealth-State inquiry into oil-drilling on the Great Barrier Reef.
Prime Minister John Gorton announces that Federal Cabinet has accepted the recommendation of a Senate select committee for Australia to adopt the metric system of weights and measures.
The six Premiers unanimously agree in Adelaide to approach Prime Minister John Gorton with a long-range plan aimed at States levying their own income-tax.
 21 January – A thunderstorm in Brisbane causes damage to 1,000 homes, widespread power blackouts and peak-hour traffic chaos.
Dick Klugman, Labor MP for Prospect, reveals that a middle-aged Ukrainian migrant, Mr. Bronislaw Chyrzynski, had been held in Long Bay Gaol for nearly four weeks because he could not speak English.
 22 January – Seven men, including high-ranking Victorian police officers are named in connection with an alleged abortion protection racket at the Victorian Government's Board of Inquiry into allegations of police corruption over abortions.
Federal Cabinet reaches a final agreement on the introduction of common health fees acceptable to the Australian Medical Association.
Primary Industry Minister Doug Anthony announces at Casino that Australia has agreed to sell about 30,000 tons of meat – worth about $25 million- to Russia within the next six months.
18 February – The Queensland Country Party is defeated in the Albert by-election.
 21 April – The Hutt River Province Principality is established.
 3 May – A new international terminal is opened at Sydney Airport
 1 July – Melbourne Airport is officially opened.
 15 October – A portion of the West Gate Bridge in Melbourne collapses, killing 35
 21 November – 1970 Australian Senate election: The Liberal/Country Coalition Government led by Prime Minister John Gorton and the Labor Party led by Gough Whitlam each ended up with 26 seats; both suffering a swing against them. The Democratic Labor Party won an additional seat and held the balance of power in the Senate. To date, this was the last occasion where a Senate election was held without an accompanying House of Representatives election.
 Establishment of the Aboriginal Legal Service (NSW/ACT).
 Pope Paul VI visits Australia.
 Elizabeth II and other members of the royal family tour Australia.

Arts and literature

 Germaine Greer publishes her book, The Female Eunuch.
 Eric Smith wins the Archibald Prize with his portrait Gruzman – Architect
 Frederick Bates wins the Wynne Prize for landscape with his painting Redfern – Southern Portal
 Dal Stivens's novel A Horse of Air wins the Miles Franklin Award

Film
 The Naked Bunyip
 The Set
 Squeeze a Flower

Sport
 26 September – Carlton defeats Collingwood by 10 points in the VFL Grand Final. In other Australian rules football leagues Clarence defeated New Norfolk in the TFL, Sturt defeated Glenelg in the SANFL and it was South Fremantle defeating Perth in the WANFL. 
19 September – The South Sydney Rabbitohs defeated Manly-Warringah Sea Eagles 23–12 in the NSWRL Grand Final at the Sydney Cricket Ground. Souths captain John Sattler played most of the game with a broken jaw. Parramatta finish in last position, claiming the wooden spoon.
26 September – John Farrington wins his second men's national marathon title, clocking 2:15:27 in Werribee.
 Baghdad Note wins the Melbourne Cup.
 Victoria wins the Sheffield Shield.
 Buccaneer takes line honours and Pacha wins on handicap in the Sydney to Hobart Yacht Race.
 The US yacht Intrepid defeats the Australian yacht Gretel II in the America's Cup.
 Australia defeats Germany 3–0 in the Federation Cup.
 Margaret Court becomes the second woman to win the Grand Slam of tennis.
 John Newcombe wins both the singles and doubles championships at Wimbledon.
 Johnny Famechon defeats Fighting Harada to retain the WBC featherweight championship.

Births
 5 January – Nigel Gaffey, rugby league player 
 8 January – Rachel Friend, actress
 17 January – Craig Crawford, politician
 24 January – Luke Egan, surfer
 27 January – Bradley Clyde, rugby league footballer
 9 February – Glenn McGrath, cricketer
 10 February – Melissa Doyle, television personality
 11 February – Troy Grant, politician
 12 February – Marty Hunt, politician
 16 February – Kimberley Kitching, politician (d. 2022)
 25 February – Peter Lew, businessman
 1 March – Joe Kelly, politician and nurse
 4 April – Jason Stoltenberg, tennis player
 19 April – Anthony Roberts, politician
 11 May – Dean Capobianco, track and field sprinter
 17 May – Jodie Rogers, diver
 25 May – Danni Roche, field hockey player
 1 June – Georgie Gardner, journalist and television host
 3 June – Jamie Durie, television host, author, and landscaper
 8 June – Stephen Renouf, rugby league footballer
 11 June – David Elliott, politician
 2 July – Matt McEachan, politician
 4 July – Tony Vidmar, soccer player
 8 July – Lisa Powell, field hockey forward
 10 July – Adam Hills, comedian and television presenter
 13 July – Sandon Stolle, tennis player
 19 July – Ashley Paske, actor
 26 July – Yvette D'Ath, politician
 27 July – Luke Foley, politician
 31 July – John Sidoti, politician
 27 August – Andy Bichel, cricketer
 3 September – Elisa Roberts, politician
 4 September – Deni Hines, singer
 15 September – Michael Usher, journalist
 22 September – Gladys Berejiklian, New South Wales politician, 45th Premier of New South Wales
 27 October – Gerard Reinmuth, architect
 8 November – David Cervinski, soccer player (d. 2019)
 17 November – Tania Zaetta, television personality
 18 November – Peta Wilson, actress
 21 November – Justin Langer, cricketer
 23 November – Stirling Hinchliffe, politician
 26 November – Dave Hughes, comedian
 27 November – Jason Woodforth, politician
 17 December – Lachlan Millar, politician

Deaths
 17 February – Sir John Jensen, 85, public servant
 13 March – Dick Eve, 68, Olympic gold medallist diver (1924)
 20 March – Arthur Corbett, 93, public servant
 1 May – Nan Chauncy, 69, children's author
 13 May – William Dobell, 70, artist and sculptor
 21 May – Elliot Lovegood Grant Watson, 84, writer and anthropologist (born and died in the United Kingdom)
 2 July – Jessie Street, 81, suffragette and feminist (born in British Raj)
 14 August – Bede Fanning, 84, public servant
 30 October – John Loder, 2nd Baron Wakehurst, 75, 29th Governor of New South Wales (born and died in the United Kingdom)
 24 November – Tilly Devine, 70, underworld figure (born in the United Kingdom)
 12 December – Doris Blackburn, 81, women's rights activist and politician
 14 December – William Slim, 79, 13th Governor-General of Australia (born and died in the United Kingdom)

References

 
Australia
Years of the 20th century in Australia